Horvathiolus is a genus of seed bugs in the family Lygaeidae. There are at least 20 described species in Horvathiolus.

Species
These 20 species belong to the genus Horvathiolus:

 Horvathiolus adonis Linnavuori, 1978
 Horvathiolus albomaculus (Lindberg, 1960)
 Horvathiolus amoenulus (Gerstaecker, 1873)
 Horvathiolus canariensis (Wagner, 1954)
 Horvathiolus contaminatus Linnavuori, 1978
 Horvathiolus delicatulus (Stal, 1855)
 Horvathiolus fulvescens (Puton, 1874)
 Horvathiolus gibbicollis (Costa, 1882)
 Horvathiolus guttatus (Rambur, 1839)
 Horvathiolus heydeni (Puton, 1892)
 Horvathiolus kiritshenkoi Josifov, 1965
 Horvathiolus longipilosus Slater & Sperry, 1973
 Horvathiolus mendosus (Horvath, 1916)
 Horvathiolus najranus Linnavuori, 1978
 Horvathiolus obscurus Linnavuori, 1978
 Horvathiolus rex Slater & Sperry, 1973
 Horvathiolus rhea Linnavuori, 1993
 Horvathiolus sudd Linnavuori, 1978
 Horvathiolus superbus (Pollich, 1783)
 Horvathiolus syriacus (Reuter, 1885)

References

Further reading

External links

 

Lygaeidae